Norwich is a city in Kingman County, Kansas, United States.  As of the 2020 census, the population of the city was 444.

History
Norwich was founded about 1885. It was named after Norwich, Connecticut.

Geography
Norwich is located at  (37.457778, -97.847160).

Climate
The climate in this area is characterized by hot, humid summers and generally mild to cool winters.  According to the Köppen Climate Classification system, Norwich has a humid subtropical climate, abbreviated "Cfa" on climate maps.

Demographics

2010 census
As of the census of 2010, there were 491 people, 176 households, and 114 families living in the city. The racial makeup of the city was 95.1% White, 0.6% African American, 1.0% Native American, and 3.3% from two or more races. Hispanic or Latino of any race were 3.3% of the population.

There were 176 households, of which 36.4% had children under the age of 18 living with them, 57.4% were married couples living together, 4.0% had a female householder with no husband present, 3.4% had a male householder with no wife present, and 35.2% were non-families. 33.0% of all households were made up of individuals, and 19.8% had someone living alone who was 65 years of age or older. The average household size was 2.63 and the average family size was 3.41.

The median age in the city was 31.8 years. 37.5% of residents were under the age of 18; 5.9% were between the ages of 18 and 24; 22.4% were from 25 to 44; 20.6% were from 45 to 64; and 13.6% were 65 years of age or older. The gender makeup of the city was 43.6% male and 56.4% female.

2000 census
As of the census of 2000, there were 551 people, 203 households, and 140 families living in the city. The racial makeup of the city was 94.92% White, 0.18% African American, 1.45% Native American, 0.18% Asian, 0.18% from other races, and 3.09% from two or more races. Hispanic or Latino of any race were 0.73% of the population.

There were 203 households, out of which 37.4% had children under the age of 18 living with them, 59.6% were married couples living together, 8.4% had a female householder with no husband present, and 31.0% were non-families. 29.6% of all households were made up of individuals, and 19.2% had someone living alone who was 65 years of age or older. The average household size was 2.54 and the average family size was 3.19.

In the city, the population was spread out, with 28.5% under the age of 18, 6.5% from 18 to 24, 26.5% from 25 to 44, 16.3% from 45 to 64, and 22.1% who were 65 years of age or older. The median age was 38 years. For every 100 females, there were 83.7 males. For every 100 females age 18 and over, there were 81.6 males.

The median income for a household in the city was $37,344, and the median income for a family was $47,857. Males had a median income of $39,167 versus $25,000 for females. The per capita income for the city was $16,268. About 4.1% of families and 6.8% of the population were below the poverty line, including 10.6% of those under age 18 and 3.2% of those age 65 or over.

Education
The community is served by Kingman–Norwich USD 331 public school district.

The Norwich Eagles won the following Kansas State High School championships:
 1974 Boys Track & Field - Class 1A
 1974 Girls Track & Field - Class 1A
 1975 Boys Track & Field - Class 1A
 1977 Girls Track & Field (Indoor) - Class 1A
 2013 Girls Track & Field - Class 1A

See also
 Farrar Corporation & Foundry

References

Further reading

External links

 City of Norwich
 Norwich - Directory of Public Officials
 Norwich city map, KDOT

Cities in Kansas
Cities in Kingman County, Kansas